Gizella Tary (19 November 1884 – 8 February 1960) was a Hungarian fencer. She competed in the women's individual foil at the 1924 and 1928 Summer Olympics. She was the first woman to represent Hungary at the Olympics.

References

External links
 

1884 births
1960 deaths
Hungarian female foil fencers
Olympic fencers of Hungary
Fencers at the 1924 Summer Olympics
Fencers at the 1928 Summer Olympics
People from Szolnok
Sportspeople from Jász-Nagykun-Szolnok County
20th-century Hungarian women